The White House, also known as H. H. Sofley House, is a historic home located at Huntsville,  Yadkin County, North Carolina.  It was built about 1795, and is a two-story, heavy timber frame, Early Republic / Late Georgian style dwelling with a Quaker plan. It has one-story rear frame additions dated to the late-19th and early-20th century. The front facade features a double-tier, full-width shed porch.

It was listed on the National Register of Historic Places in 1982.

References

Houses on the National Register of Historic Places in North Carolina
Georgian architecture in North Carolina
Houses completed in 1795
Houses in Yadkin County, North Carolina
National Register of Historic Places in Yadkin County, North Carolina